Arrestin, beta 1, also known as ARRB1, is a protein which in humans is encoded by the ARRB1 gene.

Function 

Members of arrestin/beta-arrestin protein family are thought to participate in agonist-mediated desensitization of G protein-coupled receptors and cause specific dampening of cellular responses to stimuli such as hormones, neurotransmitters, or sensory signals.  Arrestin beta 1 is a cytosolic protein and acts as a cofactor in the beta-adrenergic receptor kinase (BARK) mediated desensitization of beta-adrenergic receptors.  Besides the central nervous system, it is expressed at high levels in  peripheral blood leukocytes, and thus the BARK/beta-arrestin system is believed to play a major role in regulating receptor-mediated immune functions.  Alternatively spliced transcripts encoding different isoforms of arrestin beta 1 have been described, however, their exact functions are not known.
Beta-arrestin has been shown to play a role as a scaffold that binds intermediates and may direct G-protein signaling by connecting receptors to clathrin-mediated endocytosis.

Interactions 

Arrestin beta 1 has been shown to interact with
 Arf6,
 PTHLH,
 DVL2
 Mdm2,
 OPRD1,
 PSCD2, and
 RALGDS.

References

Further reading

External links